Blagoj Jankov Mučeto (Macedonian: Благој Јанков Мучето) was a Macedonian partisan who was declared a People's Hero of Yugoslavia. He was born in 1911 in Strumica, in the Salonica Vilayet of the Ottoman Empire (present-day Republic of Macedonia) and died on 14 July 1944 at the gates of the city park in Strumica while being chased by the Bulgarian police. The house where he was born and lived is now a memorial dedicated to him.

References

1911 births
1944 deaths
People from Strumica
People from Salonica vilayet
Yugoslav Partisans members
Recipients of the Order of the People's Hero